is a retired Japanese tennis player.

On 6 November 2006, she reached her career-high WTA singles ranking of No. 128. On 31 October 2011, she also reached her highest doubles ranking of No. 270.

In 2013, after Japanese national championships, and after ten years playing on the ITF Women's Circuit, Takao announced her retirement.

ITF Circuit finals

Singles (4–11)

Doubles (2–4)

External links
 
 

1987 births
Living people
Japanese female tennis players
Sportspeople from Chiba Prefecture
20th-century Japanese women
21st-century Japanese women